This is an overview of the suborder Serpentes, its two infraorders (subdivisions) and the families they contain. This is the group of reptiles commonly known as snakes.

Taxonomy 
There are two infraorders of living snakes: Alethinophidia and Scolecophidia. This separation is based primarily on morphological characteristics between family groups; however, more recently, the comparison of mitochondrial DNA has played its part.

As with most taxonomic classifications, there are many different interpretations of the evolutionary relationships. This had resulted in families being moved to different infraorders, the merging or splitting of infraorders and families. For instance, many sources classify Boidae and Pythonidae as the same family, or keep others, such as Elapidae and Hydrophiidae, separate for practical reasons despite their extremely close relationship.

See also
 List of snakes—Overview of all snake families and genera.
 List of Lacertilia families, lizards.
 List of Anuran families, frogs.

References
 
 Suborder Ophidia (Serpentes) - Snakes (phylogeny) at New Reptile Database. Accessed 4 August 2007.

 Serpentes